Kabala West is a residential area in Nigeria. The Zip Code is 800263. It is a suburb of Kaduna and is under the Kaduna South Local Government Area of Kaduna State.

Education
It has Blessed Academy, as well as 'Arch. Namadi Sambo Government Secondary School. In 2020, some students were reported by This Day Live to have been involved in examination malpractice during a Senior Secondary Certificate Examination (SSCE) aptitude test organised by the NECO.

Demographics
The dominant ethnic groups are those of Southern Kaduna origins (like the Atyap, Bajju, Ham and others), Igbo and Yoruba and others. It also has some populations of Ghanaians, Liberians and Sierra Leoneans. Dominant Religions are Christianity and Islam. Churches include 1st Ecwa Church, Ecwa Goodnews, Shalom Church, Sharonite Ministries, Christ Apostolic Church, Redeemed Christian Church of God (RCCG), Cherubim and Seraphim among others. There is a central mosque also in the community. The area had been involved in religious clashes in the past.

Infrastructure

Transportation

Roads 
The Western bypass road in the city of Kaduna which sees the passage of heavy vehicular traffic passes partly across Kabala West.

References

Kaduna
Populated places in Kaduna State